Alfred Johansson (8 May 1876 – 28 March 1941) was a Swedish diver. He competed in the men's plain high diving event at the 1912 Summer Olympics.

References

External links
 

1876 births
1941 deaths
Swedish male divers
Olympic divers of Sweden
Divers at the 1906 Intercalated Games
Divers at the 1912 Summer Olympics
Divers from Stockholm
20th-century Swedish people